The 2003–04 Southern Football League season was the 101st in the history of the league, an English football competition.

It was the last season for the Southern Football League as a feeder for the Conference Premier. At the end of the season, the Premier Division was replaced as a level 6 league (along with the Northern Premier League Premier Division and Isthmian League Premier Division) by the newly formed Conference North and Conference South. The Premier Division lost more than half its clubs to newly formed divisions, and the two regional divisions had a number of their clubs promoted to the Premier Division to replace them. Thus, the Southern Football League divisions downgraded to 7-8 levels.

Premier Division
The Premier Division consisted of 22 clubs, including 17 clubs from the previous season and five new clubs:
Two clubs promoted from the Eastern Division:
Dorchester Town
Eastbourne Borough

Two clubs promoted from the Western Division:
Merthyr Tydfil
Weston-super-Mare

Plus:
Nuneaton Borough, relegated from the Football Conference

Crawley Town won the division and were promoted to the Conference National. Clubs finished higher than 14th position were to transfer to the newly created Conference North and South divisions and clubs finished higher than 18th position plus winners of divisions One were to participate in the play-offs for a two final spots in Conference North/South. 

There were no relegation from the Premier Division this season, though, due to league reform, clubs remained in the division downgraded from sixth tier to seventh.

League table

Play-offs

Stadia and locations

Eastern Division
The Eastern Division consisted of 22 clubs, including 18 clubs from the previous season and four new clubs:
Two clubs relegated from the Premier Division:
Hastings United
Folkestone Invicta

Plus:
Burgess Hill Town, promoted from the Sussex County League
Eastleigh, promoted from the Wessex League

League table

Stadia and locations

Western Division
The Western Division consisted of 22 clubs, including 18 clubs from the previous season and four new clubs:
Two clubs relegated from the Premier Division:
Halesowen Town
Ilkeston Town

Plus:
Team Bath, promoted from the Western League
Yate Town, promoted from the Hellenic League

League table

Stadia and locations

See also
Southern Football League
2003–04 Isthmian League
2003–04 Northern Premier League

References

Southern Football League seasons
6